Ahmad Beyglu (also Romanized as Aḩmad Beyglū) is a village in Meshgin-e Gharbi Rural District of Qosabeh District, Meshgin Shahr County, Ardabil province, Iran. At the 2006 census, its population was 1,385 in 328 households. The following census in 2011 counted 1,231 people in 341 households. The latest census in 2016 showed a population of 1,133 people in 335 households; it was the largest village in its rural district.

References 

Meshgin Shahr County

Towns and villages in Meshgin Shahr County

Populated places in Ardabil Province

Populated places in Meshgin Shahr County